Mohammed Al-Shahrani (born 25 May 1982) is a Saudi Arabian former footballer.

External links
Saudi League Profile

1982 births
Living people
Sportspeople from Riyadh
Saudi Arabian footballers
Association football forwards
Al Nassr FC players
Ettifaq FC players
Al-Riyadh SC players
Al-Fateh SC players
Hajer FC players
Damac FC players
Al-Diriyah Club players
Saudi First Division League players
Saudi Professional League players
Saudi Arabia international footballers